Venky is a 2004 Indian Telugu-language comedy thriller film written and directed by Srinu Vaitla, and produced by Atluri Purnachandra Rao. The film stars Ravi Teja, Sneha, and Ashutosh Rana while Devi Sri Prasad composed music. The film marks Vaitla's first collaboration with writers Kona Venkat and Gopimohan. 

Released on 26 March 2004, the film was successful at the box office.

Plot 
Venkateswarlu "Venky" is a wayward youth from Vizag. After several unsuccessful attempts of finding employment, Venky and his friends Suri, Ramana and Bujji, luckily clear a police recruitment test, and they are selected for SI  training. They travel to Hyderabad on Godavari Express train to attend the training. Venky meets Sravani on the train and instantly falls for her. He proposes the same to her, but she harshly rejects the proposal. Furious Venky threatens to murder Sravani's father Prasad Rao and a lady co-passenger, in a state of inebriation. To their astonishment, both of them are found dead the next morning. 

Venky and his friends quickly escape from there. On a belief that the police academy is the only safe haven for them, they join the training immediately. The academy chief Yogendra Kumar Sharma is a very strict officer and a close friend of ACP Bharath, who is assigned to investigate the train murders case. In order to escape the scrutiny, they enter Sharma's office at night to tamper with the date of their arrival, but they find that Sharma himself is responsible for the murders. They learn that Sharma is after Prasad Rao's camera and Sravani would also be killed. Venky saves Sravani and keeps her in an old building behind their academy.

Later, they overhear that Bharat has found Venky's camera as evidence and its reel is given for development. They head to the studio beforehand and receives those photos. Upon looking at them, Venky finds out that Gajala, who introduced himself as a software engineer is actually a thief. They trace him and enquire about Prasad Rao's camera, but he lies that he had already sold it. Sharma finds out that Venky and his friends are after him, where he publicizes their names in the media and pressurizes their parents so that they would turn themselves in. He also finds out about Sravani's hideout and attacks her but she escapes. 

Venky and Sharma make a deal to hand over Prasad Rao's camera which he doesn't honour. Gajala sees an opportunity and calls Sharma to make a deal in exchange for the camera, but Venky takes away the camera from him. With the camera, they learn that Prasad Rao recorded Sharma murdering a senior officer Sarath Kumar IPS, as he wanted  to escape from a fake stamp case. Prasad Rao unknowingly called Sharma to report the murder. He came to their home to take the camera, but they escaped to their village. 

Unaware that Sharma came to their home, Prasad Rao gave away their berth numbers, and Sharma sent his hitman to kill them, murdering him and a lady who slept on Sravani's berth. Sharma's henchmen attack them for the camera, but Venky fights them off. Sravani seeks the Governor's appointment to directly submit the camera as evidence. Sharma tries to shoot them, but is caught red-handed in front of the Governor. Venky and his friends are awarded medals in appreciation of their bravery.

Cast

Soundtrack 

The music and background score was composed by Devi Sri Prasad.

Reception 
A review from Sify opined that Venky was a mishmash of three films, the Malayalam film No.20 Madras Mail and the American films Training Day and Police Academy. They added that the film failed to impress as it missed a "natural flow of one leading to another." Idlebrain.com rated the film 3/5 appreciated the film for its humour but wrote the film falls flat as the suspense is revealed.

References

External links

2004 films
Films directed by Srinu Vaitla
2000s Telugu-language films
2000s comedy thriller films
Indian comedy thriller films
2004 comedy films